Mammutidae is an extinct family of proboscideans that appeared during the Oligocene epoch and survived until the start of the Holocene. The family was first described in 1922, classifying fossil specimens of the type genus Mammut (mastodons), and has since been placed in various arrangements of the order. The name "mastodon" derives from Greek,  "nipple" and  "tooth", as with the genus, referring to a characteristic that distinguishes them from allied families. Mammutids ranged very widely, with fossils found in North America, Africa, and throughout Eurasia.

Description 

Mammutids are characterised by their zygodont (having the opposite cusps merged into ridges) molars which are morphologically conservative (showing little variation) amongst all members of the family. Early members of the group like Eozygodon and Zygolophodon had elongate lower jaws with lower incisors/tusks, while in later representatives like Sinomammut and Mammut, the lower incisors/tusks were either lost or only vestigially present, and the lower jaws shortened (brevirostrine). This process happened convergently amongst other elephantimorph proboscideans, including gomphotheres, stegodontids, and elephantids. The mammutid "Mammut" borsoni is one of the largest of all proboscideans, with one specimen having an estimated mass of 16 tonnes, making it one of the largest land mammals of all time.

Evolution 
Mammutids are the most basal group within Elephantimorpha, with gomphotheres being more closely related to elephants, Mammutids originated in Africa during the Late Oligocene, and entered Eurasia across the "Gomphotherium land bridge" during the early Miocene. Mammutid remains are generally rare in Eurasia in comparison to contemporary gomphotheres and deinotheres. During the late early Miocene, a population of Zygolophodon entered North America, giving rise to Mammut. At the beginning of the Pleistocene, around 2 to 2.5 million years ago, the last of the Eurasian mammutids, "Mammut" borsoni became extinct, with members of Mammut persisting in North America until the end of the Pleistocene, approximately 11,000 years ago.

References 

Mastodons
Miocene first appearances
Prehistoric mammal families

nl:Mastodont